Dicata is a genus of sea slugs, specifically of aeolid nudibranchs. Only one species is known to belong to this genus, a marine gastropod mollusc in the family Facelinidae.

Species
Species in this genus include:
 ''Dicata odhneri Schmekel, 1967

References

Facelinidae